The Tsubawara Dam, also known as the Tsubakihara Dam, is a gravity dam on the Shō River about  north of Shirakawa in Gifu Prefecture, Japan. It was constructed between 1952 and 1953. The dam has an associated 107 MW hydroelectric power station which was built in two parts. The first part of the power station (42 MW) was commissioned in 1954 and the second part of the power station (65 MW) was commissioned in 1975. Of the nine dams on the Shō River it is the seventh furthest downstream.

See also

Narude Dam – downstream
Hatogaya Dam – upstream

References

Dams in Gifu Prefecture
Gravity dams
Dams completed in 1953
Dams on the Shō River
Hydroelectric power stations in Japan